The St. Elmo W. Acosta Bridge spans the St. Johns River in Jacksonville, Florida on a fixed span. It is named for City Councilman St. Elmo W. Acosta, who convinced voters to approve a $950,000 bond issue for the original bridge at the site. It carries a total of six lanes of SR 13 with the two-track Jacksonville Skyway in the median and sidewalks on the outside.

Prior to its replacement in 1991, the bridge, originally called St. Johns River Bridge, opened in 1921 and carried three lanes (center one reversible) on a lift bridge of similar design to the nearby Main Street Bridge but was known as the Yellow Monster, largely for its tendency to stick in the upward position. Tolls were charged until 1940, earning more than $4 million for the City of Jacksonville. At some time in 1991, the original bridge was closed to allow construction of the new one to proceed.

The Acosta Bridge was also notable due to its blue neon lights that illuminated the bridge at night. In February 2015 the Jacksonville Transportation Authority announced that the neon lights would "be off indefinitely with no return date on the books" citing a lack of funding for repairs. However, in 2019 the JTA began a $2.6 million project to replace the inoperable neon lights with LED lights. Installation is expected to be completed by summer 2020 and unlike the neon lights, the new LEDs will be able to display any color, not just blue.

North (downtown) approach
The original north approach was a T-shaped viaduct, with the bridge ending at Riverside Avenue (US 17/SR 15). Just southwest of the Acosta Bridge, Riverside Avenue passed over the adjacent Florida East Coast Railway bridge approach.

When the bridge was rebuilt, the intersection was rebuilt as a semi-directional T interchange. Direct high-speed connections were provided between the bridge and both directions on Riverside Avenue, as well as a direct ramp from the bridge to the intersection of Broad Street and Bay Street (Riverside Avenue splits into a one-way pair of Broad Street and Jefferson Street north of the bridge).

South approach
The bridge originally emptied out on Miami Road (now Prudential Drive) just west of San Marco Boulevard, with a continuation, at least southbound, to San Marco Boulevard. SR 13 went south on San Marco Boulevard, and was later changed to go east on Miami Road.

Around 1958, a system of freeways was built in Jacksonville. This system included an eastern approach for the recently opened Fuller Warren Bridge, along with the older Acosta Bridge and Main Street Bridge, carrying traffic to the Philips Highway (U.S. Route 1 (SR 5)) and Atlantic Boulevard (US 90 (SR 10)). A new approach to the Acosta Bridge was built, splitting from the old one two blocks north of Miami Road, and passing over the intersection of Miami Road and San Marco Boulevard before merging with the other bridge approaches. The old approach became southbound only, and northbound access was provided at Mary Street, two blocks north of Miami Road. A northbound exit was also provided at Mary Street for traffic coming from the south and east. No southbound entrance was provided, but the adjacent Main Street Bridge approach provided access in that direction.

When the bridge was rebuilt, the south approach was kept almost identical. The only real difference was a new northbound onramp from Museum Circle, one block north of Mary Street.
The popular Diamond Head Lobster House was in its path and had to be demolished.

References

External links
List of Jacksonville Bridges both past and present
Acosta Bridge Replacement
Acosta Bridge license plates, allowing owners to travel over the bridge for free
City of Jacksonville article about the bridges (PDF)

Bridges completed in 1921
Bridges completed in 1994
Bridges in Jacksonville, Florida
Road-rail bridges in the United States
U.S. Route 1
Road bridges in Florida
Railroad bridges in Florida
Bridges over the St. Johns River
Former toll bridges in Florida
1921 establishments in Florida
Concrete bridges in the United States
Box girder bridges in the United States